Eucosma scutiformis is a species of moth of the family Tortricidae. It is found in China  (Sichuan) and Japan.

References

Moths described in 1931
Eucosmini